Gautam Ashram was a gurukul of the ancient Indian philosopher Gautama. It is located at  the west bank of Khiroi river in Brahmpur village of Jale block of Darbhanga district in Bihar. It is only at a seven kilometres distance from Kamtaul railway station.

Background 
It is believed that Aksapada Gautama wrote his famous book Nyaya Shastra at this place. There is also a very famous pond known as Gautam Kund, where Gautam Rishi took his bath daily.  Aksapada Gautama was the Acharya of the Ancient Mithila University. He taught Nyaya Shastra to his disciples. So this place was also a Gurukul of the Ancient Mithila University. Nearby the ashram, there is Ahilya Sthan related to Ahilya. Ahilya was the wife of Gautam Rishi. Gautam Ashram and Ahilya Sthan have a great importance in the history of ancient Mithila.

Seven Days Conference in the Ashram 
A very famous conference of Philosophical discussion and debate was held by Aksapada Gautama at his Ashram. He was the Kulpati of his Ashram. The scholars and Kulpaties of different Ashrams from different parts of Mithila and outside Mithila region gathered here to deliver lectures and participate in discussion on the knotty problem of the day, spiritualism and many mysteries of the nature. Scholars and Kulpaties of different Ashrams brought hundreds of new books on spiritualism and philosophies. Aksapada Gautama was very curious to copy all these books. He copied some of them. But he was very busy in welcoming the Scholars and Kulpaties of different Ashrams who came there, so his entrusted the task of copying the books to the Acharyas and Brahmcharies of his own Ashram. Seerdhawaja Janaka, the Emperor of Mithila and Devraj Indra also arrived in this conference. Seerdhawaja Janaka was also the Kuladhipati of all the Kulpaties of the Ashrams in his kingdom. He ensured to Aksapada Gautama for the funding and security of the  Ashram. Then the Ashram was decorated very beautiful to welcome Devraj Indra.

References 

Ancient Indian philosophers
Indian philosophy
Tourist attractions in Darbhanga district
Hindu educational institutions